Sir George Ralph Fetherston, 3rd Baronet (4 June 1784 – 12 July 1853) was an Anglo-Irish politician.

Fetherston was the son of Sir Thomas Fetherston, 2nd Baronet. He sat in the House of Commons of the United Kingdom as the Member of Parliament for Longford between 1819 and 1830. On 19 July 1819 he succeeded to his father's baronetcy.

References

1784 births
1853 deaths
19th-century Anglo-Irish people
Baronets in the Baronetage of Ireland
UK MPs 1818–1820
UK MPs 1820–1826
UK MPs 1826–1830